Lysets is an urban-type settlement in Ivano-Frankivsk Raion of Ivano-Frankivsk Oblast, located  from the oblast capital Ivano-Frankivsk. It hosts the administration of Lysets settlement hromada, one of the hromadas of Ukraine. Population: .

Until 18 July 2020, Lysets belonged to Tysmenytsia Raion. The raion was abolished in July 2020 as part of the administrative reform of Ukraine, which reduced the number of raions of Ivano-Frankivsk Oblast to six. The area of Tysmenytsia Raion was merged into Ivano-Frankivsk Raion.

References

External links
 Jewish history and photographs of Jewish sites in Lysets in Jewish History in Galicia and Bukovina

Urban-type settlements in Ivano-Frankivsk Raion